The 2019 Oracle Challenger Series – Newport Beach was a professional tennis tournament played on outdoor hard courts. It was the second edition of the tournament, which is part of the 2019 ATP Challenger Tour and the 2019 WTA 125K series. It took place from January 21–27, 2019 in Newport Beach, United States.

Point distribution

Men's singles main-draw entrants

Seeds

 1 Rankings are as of 14 January 2019.

Other entrants
The following players received wildcards into the singles main draw:
  Ulises Blanch
  Taylor Fritz
  Marcos Giron
  Patrick Kypson
  Roy Smith

The following player received entry into the singles main draw as an alternate:
  Collin Altamirano

The following players received entry from the qualifying draw:
  Maxime Cressy
  Evan Song

The following player received entry as a lucky loser:
  Alafia Ayeni

Women's singles main-draw entrants

Seeds

 1 Rankings are as of 14 January 2019.

Other entrants
The following players received wildcards into the singles main draw:
  Hanna Chang  
  Haley Giavara 
  Elizabeth Halbauer 
  Maegan Manasse

The following players received entry from the qualifying draw:
  Giuliana Olmos
  Katie Volynets

Withdrawals
Before the tournament
  Sofia Kenin → replaced by  Urszula Radwańska
  Kristína Kučová → replaced by  Lena Rüffer
  Anna Karolína Schmiedlová → replaced by  Mari Osaka
  CoCo Vandeweghe → replaced by  Kayla Day

Women's doubles main-draw entrants

Seeds 

 1 Rankings as of 14 January 2019

Other entrants 
The following pair received wildcard into the doubles main draw:
  Gail Brodsky /  Francesca Di Lorenzo

Champions

Men's singles

  Taylor Fritz def.  Brayden Schnur, 7–6(9–7), 6–4

Women's singles

  Bianca Andreescu def.  Jessica Pegula 0–6, 6–4, 6–2

Men's doubles

 Robert Galloway /  Nathaniel Lammons def.  Romain Arneodo /  Andrei Vasilevski 7–5, 7–6(7–1)

Women's doubles

  Hayley Carter /  Ena Shibahara def.  Taylor Townsend /  Yanina Wickmayer, 6–3, 7–6(7–1)

References

External links 
 Official website

2019
2019 ATP Challenger Tour
2019 WTA 125K series
2019 in American tennis
January 2019 sports events in the United States